The Nordic Naturals Challenger (formerly Comerica Bank Challenger) is a professional tennis tournament played on outdoor hard courts. It is currently part of the ATP Challenger Tour. It is held annually at the Seascape Sports Club in Aptos, California, United States, since 1988.

Past finals

Singles

Doubles

External links
Official website
ITF Search

 
ATP Challenger Tour
Hard court tennis tournaments in the United States